The South Atlantic League, often informally called the Sally League, is a Minor League Baseball league with teams predominantly in states along the Atlantic coast of the United States from New York to Georgia. A Class A league for most of its history, the league was promoted to High-A as part of Major League Baseball's 2021 reorganization of the minor leagues. The league temporarily operated for the 2021 season as the High-A East before reassuming its original moniker in 2022.

A number of different leagues known as the South Atlantic League (SAL) have existed since 1904. The most recent SAL adopted the moniker in 1980, having previously been the Western Carolinas League, founded in 1963. All of these have been nicknamed "Sally League".

History

There have been several South Atlantic Leagues in the history of minor league baseball, spanning from 1904 to the present with a few breaks. The league ran from 1904 to 1917 as a class C league, then started up again in 1919, also class C. This time it ran from 1919 to 1930, moving up to class B beginning in 1921. William G. Bramham became league president in mid-1924 and served until 1930. The league was restarted again as a class B from 1936 to 1942, shut down as a result of World War II, and returned in 1946 as a class A league. The AA Southern Association (which never integrated) died after the 1961 season and so the SAL was promoted to AA in 1963 to take its place; a year later the name was changed to the Southern League. Out of the 51 seasons of operation, Augusta, Georgia competed in 46, Macon, Georgia was around for 46, and Columbia, South Carolina was in 45. Charleston, South Carolina; Jacksonville, Florida; Savannah, Georgia; and Columbus, Georgia; each competed for at least 29 years also, making for a relatively stable lineup.

The South Atlantic League name went unused for 16 years, but in 1980 the Western Carolinas League brought back the name when it sought to change its identity. For nearly 60 years, 1948 through 2007, the dominant figure in the WCL/SAL was league founder and president John Henry Moss, who started the WCL as a young man in 1948, refounded it in 1960 and then led it into the new century. Moss retired at the close of the 2007 South Atlantic League season. He died at age 90 on July 1, 2009, at Kings Mountain, North Carolina—a town where he had also been mayor for 23 years.

In 2005, the SAL had the highest attendance in 101 years with over 3,541,992 fans (while minor league baseball set a second straight record with 41,333,279 attendees). When the league last played a season, in 2019, it had 14 teams, divided into two divisions of seven clubs.

The start of the 2020 season was postponed due to the COVID-19 pandemic before ultimately being cancelled on June 30. 

As part of Major League Baseball's 2021 reorganization of the minor leagues, the South Atlantic League was promoted to High-A and temporarily renamed the "High-A East" for the 2021 season. Following MLB's acquisition of the rights to the names of the historical minor leagues, the High-A East was renamed the South Atlantic League effective with the 2022 season.

Current teams

South Atlantic League teams (1980–present)
Notes: • An "^" indicates that team's article redirects to an article of an active team in a different league

 Aberdeen IronBirds
 Albany Polecats
 Anderson Braves
 Asheville Tourists
 Augusta GreenJackets^
 Augusta Reds
 Bowling Green Hot Rods
 Brooklyn Cyclones
 Cape Fear Crocs
 Capital City Bombers
 Charleston Alley Cats
 Charleston Bombers
 Charleston Pirates
 Charleston Rainbows
 Charleston RiverDogs^
 Charleston Royals
 Charleston Wheelers
 Charleston Yankees
 Columbia Fireflies^
 Columbia Mets
 Columbus Catfish
 Columbus Indians
 Columbus RedStixx
 Delmarva Shorebirds^
 Fayetteville Generals
 Florence Blue Jays
 Gastonia Cardinals
 Gastonia Expos
 Gastonia Jets
 Gastonia Rangers
 Gastonia Tigers
 Greensboro Bats
 Greensboro Grasshoppers
 Greensboro Hornets
 Greenwood Pirates
 Greenville Drive
 Hagerstown Suns
 Hickory Crawdads
 Hudson Valley Renegades
 Jersey Shore BlueClaws
 Kannapolis Cannon Ballers^
 Kannapolis Intimidators
 Lake County Captains
 Lakewood BlueClaws
 Lexington Legends^
 Macon Braves
 Macon Peaches
 Macon Pirates
 Macon Redbirds
 Myrtle Beach Blue Jays
 Myrtle Beach Hurricanes
 Piedmont Boll Weevils
 Piedmont Phillies
 Rome Braves
 Santee Indians
 Santee Pirates
 Savannah Cardinals
 Savannah Sand Gnats
 Shelby Mets
 Shelby Pirates
 South Georgia Waves
 Spartanburg Traders
 Spartanburg Phillies
 Spartanburg Spinners
 Spartanburg Suns
 Sumter Braves
 Sumter Flyers
 West Virginia Power^
 Wilmington Blue Rocks
 Wilmington Waves
 Winston-Salem Dash

League timeline

League champions

South Atlantic League Hall of Fame

The South Atlantic League Hall of Fame was started in 1994.

References

External links

Obituary of John Henry Moss

 
Sports leagues established in 1980
Professional sports leagues in the United States
Minor baseball leagues in the United States